The writing systems of Africa refer to the current and historical practice of writing systems on the African continent, both indigenous and those introduced.

Today, the Latin script is commonly encountered across Africa, especially in the Western, Central and Southern Africa regions. Arabic script is mainly used in North Africa and  Ge'ez script is widely used in the Horn of Africa. Regionally and in some localities, other scripts may be of significant importance.

Indigenous writing systems

Ancient African orthographies

Ancient Egyptian
Perhaps the most famous African writing system is ancient Egyptian hieroglyphs. These developed later into forms known as Hieratic, Demotic and, through Phoenician and Greek, Coptic. The Coptic language is still used today as the liturgical language in the Coptic Orthodox Church of Alexandria and the Coptic Catholic Church of Alexandria. As mentioned above, the Bohairic dialect of Coptic is used currently in the Coptic Orthodox Church. Other dialects include Sahidic, Akhmimic, Lycopolitan, Fayyumic, and Oxyrhynchite.

Ancient Meroitic 

The Meroitic language and its writing system was used in Meroë and the wider Kingdom of Kush (in modern day Sudan) during the Meroitic period. It was used from 300 BCE to 400 CE.

Tifinagh
The Tifinagh alphabet is still actively used to varying degrees in trade and modernized forms for writing of Berber languages (Tamazight, Tamashek, etc.) of the Maghreb, Sahara, and Sahel regions (Savage 2008).

Neo-Tifinagh is encoded in the Unicode range U+2D30 to U+2D7F, starting from version 4.1.0. There are 55 defined characters, but there are more characters being used than those defined. In ISO 15924, the code Tfng is assigned to Neo-Tifinagh.

Ge'ez

The Geʽez script is an abugida that was created in Horn of Africa in the 8th-9th century BC for writing the Geʽez language. The script is used today in Ethiopia and Eritrea for Amharic, Tigrinya, and several other languages. It is sometimes called Ethiopic, and is known in Eritrea and Ethiopia as the fidel or abugida.

Geʽez or Ethiopic has been computerized and assigned Unicode 3.0 codepoints between U+1200 and U+137F (decimal 4608–4991), containing the basic syllable signs for Geʽez, Amharic, and Tigrinya, punctuation and numerals.

Nsibidi
Nsibidi (also known as "nsibiri", "nchibiddi", and "nchibiddy") is a system of symbols indigenous to what is now southeastern Nigeria that is apparently an ideographic script, though there have been suggestions that it includes logographic elements. The symbols are at least several centuries old: early forms appeared on excavated pottery as well as what are most likely ceramic stools and headrests from the Calabar region, with a range of dates from 400 (and possibly earlier, 2000 BC) to 1400 CE.

Adinkra

Adinkra is a set of symbols developed by the Akan, used to represent concepts and aphorisms. Oral tradition attributes the origin of adinkra to Gyaman in modern-day Ghana and Côte d'Ivoire. According to Kwame Anthony Appiah, they were one of the means for "supporting the transmission of a complex and nuanced body of practice and belief".

Adinkra iconography has been adapted into several segmental scripts, including
 The Adinkra Alphabet, invented by Charles Korankye in 2015, and expanded and refined over the next several years to accommodate various languages spoken in Ghana and Ivory Coast such as Akan, Dagbani, Ewe and Ga- a process that culminated with the creation of a standardized font in 2020.
 Adinkra Nkyea, a writing system based on the Adinkra symbols.. Some Ghanaians use the Adinkra Nkyea writing system for the Akan Language and its dialects. A Majority of Adinkra Nkyea is derived from the original Adinkra Symbols. Adinkra Nkyea contains some 39 characters, ten numerals, and three punctuation marks.

Lusona

Lusona is a system of ideograms that functioned as mnemonic devices to record proverbs, fables, games, riddles and animals, and to transmit knowledge. They originate in what is now eastern Angola, northwestern Zambia and adjacent areas of the Democratic Republic of the Congo.

Modern orthographies

East Africa
 The Luo script was developed to write Dholuo in Kenya in 2009.

 Somalia: Writing systems developed in the twentieth century for transcribing Somali include the Osmania, Borama and Kaddare alphabets, which were invented by Osman Yusuf Kenadid, Sheikh Abdurahman Sheikh Nuur and Hussein Sheikh Ahmed Kaddare, respectively. The Osmanya script is today available in the Unicode range 10480-104AF [from U+10480 - U+104AF (66688–66735)].

 An alphasyllabic script for Oromo in Ethiopia was invented in the late 1950s by Sheikh Bakri Sapalo (1895-1980), and saw limited use.

 An alphabetic script called Nilerian has been invented by Aleu Majok for Dinka and other languages of South Sudan "The New Muonjang (Dinka) Script"</ref>

Southern Africa
 In Southern Africa, the Mwangwego alphabet is used to write Malawian languages.
 IsiBheqe SoHlamvu (Bheqe Syllabary), also known as Ditema tsa Dinoko, is a featural syllabary used to write Southern Bantu languages.

Central Africa
 The Eghap script was used by the Bagam (Tuchscherer 1999, Rovenchak 2009) of Cameroon
 The Mandombe script was invented by Wabeladio Payi in 1978 in what is now Kongo Central province, Democratic Republic of the Congo. It is promoted by the Kimbanguist Church and used for writing Kikongo, Lingala, Tshiluba, Swahili, and other languages.
 Zaghawa (Beria) of Darfur and Chad, developed by Siddick Adam Issa from an earlier proposal by schoolteacher Adam Tajir based on traditional livestock brands.

West Africa
There are various other writing systems native to West Africa and Central Africa. In the last two centuries, a large variety of writing systems have been created in Africa (Dalby 1967, 1968, 1969). Some are still in use today, while others have been largely displaced by non-African writing such as the Arabic script and the Latin script. Below are non-Latin and non-Arabic-based writing systems used to write various languages of Africa:

 The Adlam alphabet developed for writing the Fula language, taught mostly in Guinea but has also been spread in neighboring countries like Senegal and Gambia.
 The Ba script, named for its creator Adama Ba, used to write Fula.
 Bamum (Bamun; also Shumom), a system of pictographic writing invented beginning in the late 19th century by Sultan Ibrahim Njoya for writing the Bamun language in what is now Cameroon. It quickly developed into a syllabary. It is rarely used today, but a fair amount of material written in this script still exists.
 Bassa alphabet of Liberia
 Bété syllabary of Ivory Coast
 Dita, used to write Fula. 
 The Garay alphabet, used to write Wolof and Mandinka in Senegal and The Gambia
 Gola Script for Liberia and eastern Sierra Leone. 
 Several scripts used for the Hausa language
 Kpelle syllabary of Liberia and Guinea 
 Loma syllabary of Liberia and Guinea
 Masaba, a syllabary invented by Woyo Couloubayi (c.1910-1982) in the early 1930s for the Bambara language of Mali.
 Medefaidrin of the Obɛri Ɔkaimɛ Church for Ibibio people.
 The Mende Ki-ka-ku or KiKaKui syllabary, invented by Kisimi Kamara in Sierra Leone in the early 20th century. It is still used.
 N'Ko, invented in 1949 by Solomana Kante in Guinea, primarily for the Manding languages. It is apparently in increasing use in West Africa, including some efforts to adapt it to other languages (Wyrod 2008).
 The Nwagu Aneke syllabary invented in the 1950s for the Igbo language of southeastern Nigeria.
 The Vai syllabary invented by Mɔmɔlu Duwalu Bukɛlɛ for the Vai language in what is now Liberia during the early 19th century. It is still used today.
 Yoruba Holy Writing for the texts of the Yoruba religion.

Introduced and adapted writing systems

Most written scripts, including Greek, Hebrew, and Arabic, were based on previous written scripts and the origin of the history of the alphabet is ultimately Egyptian Hieroglyphs, through Proto-Sinaitic or Old Canaanite. Many other indigenous African scripts were similarly developed from previous scripts.

Phoenician/Punic
The Phoenicians from what is now Lebanon traded with North Africans and founded cities there, the most famous being Carthage. The Phoenician alphabet is thought to be the origin of many others, including: Arabic, Greek, and Latin. The Carthaginian dialect is  called Punic.  Today's Tifinagh is thought by some scholars to be descended from Punic, but this is still under debate.

Additionally, the Proto-Sinaitic Wadi el-Hol inscriptions indicate the presence of an extremely early form of the script in central Egypt (near the modern city of Qena) in the early 2nd millennium BC.

Greek
The Greek alphabet was adapted in Egypt to the Coptic alphabet (with the addition of 7 letters derived from ancient Demotic) in order to write the language (which is today only a liturgical language of the Coptic Church). An uncial variant of the Coptic alphabet was used from the 8th to the 15th century for writing Old Nubian, an ancient variety of the Nubian language.

Arabic
 
The Arabic script was introduced into Africa by the spread of Islam and by trade. Apart from its obvious use for the Arabic language, it has been adapted for a number of other languages over the centuries. The Arabic script is still used in some of these cases, but not in others.

It was often necessary to modify the script to accommodate sounds not represented in the script as used for the Arabic language. The adapted form of the script is also called Ajami, especially in the Sahel, and sometimes by specific names for individual languages, such as Wolofal, Sorabe, and Wadaad writing. Despite the existence of a widely known and well-established script in Ethiopia and Eritrea there are a few cases where Muslims in Ethiopia and Eritrea have used the Arabic script, instead, for reasons of religious identity.

There are no official standard forms or orthographies, though local usage follows traditional practice for the area or language. There was an effort by ISESCO to standardize Ajami usage. Some critics believe this relied too much on Perso-Arabic script forms and not enough on existing use in Africa. In any event, the effect of that standardization effort has been limited.

Latin

The first systematic attempts to adapt the Latin script to African languages were probably those of Christian missionaries on the eve of European colonization (Pasch 2008). These however were isolated, done by people without linguistic training, and sometimes resulted in competing systems for the same or similar languages.

One of the challenges in adapting the Latin script to many African languages was the use in those tongues of sounds unfamiliar to Europeans and thus without writing convention they could resort to. Various use was made of letter combinations, modifications, and diacritics to represent such sounds. Some resulting orthographies, such as the Yoruba writing system established by the late 19th century, have remained largely intact.

In many cases, the colonial regimes had little interest in the writing of African languages, but in others they did. In the case of Hausa in Northern Nigeria, for instance, the colonial government was directly involved in determining the written forms for the language.

Since the colonial period, there have been efforts to propose and promulgate standardized or at least harmonized approaches to using the Latin script for African languages. Examples include the Standard Alphabet by Lepsius (mid-19th century) and the Africa Alphabet of the International Institute of African Languages and Cultures (1928, 1930).

Following independence there has been continued attention to the transcription of African languages. In the 1960s and 1970s, UNESCO facilitated several "expert meetings" on the subject, including a seminal meeting in Bamako in 1966, and one in Niamey in 1978. The latter produced the African reference alphabet. Various country-level standardizations have also been made or proposed, such as the Pan-Nigerian alphabet. A Berber Latin alphabet for northern Berber includes extended Latin characters and two Greek letters.

Such discussions continue, especially on more local scales regarding cross-border languages.

Hebrew
There has been a Jewish presence in North Africa for millennia, with communities speaking a variety of different languages.  Though some of these are written with the Arabic script (as is the case with Judeo-Tunisian Arabic) or with Ge'ez (as with Kayla and Qwara), many- including Haketia and several forms of Judeo-Arabic- have made frequent or exclusive use of the Hebrew alphabet.

Braille
Braille, a tactile script widely used by the visually impaired, has been adapted to write several African languages- including those of Nigeria, South Africa and Zambia.

Office/computer technology, fonts and standards

Typewriters
There is not much information on the adaptation of typewriters to African language needs (apart from Arabic, and the African languages that do not use any modified Latin letters). There were apparently some typewriters fitted with keys for typing Nigerian languages. There was at least one IBM Selectric typewriter "typeball" developed for some African languages (including Fula).

Around 1930, the English typewriter was modified by Ayana Birru of Ethiopia to type an incomplete and ligated version of the Amharic alphabet.

The 1982 proposal for a unicase version of the African reference alphabet made by Michael Mann and David Dalby included a suggested typewriter adaptation.

Now type writers have been modified to type Tigrigna and Tigrayt languages which are the closest to Geez as well.

Early computing and fonts
With early desktop computers it was possible to modify existing 8-bit Latin fonts to accommodate specialized character needs. This was done without any kind of system or standardization, meaning incompatibility of encodings.

Similarly, there were diverse efforts (successful, but not standardized) to enable use of Ethiopic-Eritrean /Ge'ez on computers.

Current standards
There was never any ISO 8859 standard for any native African languages. One standard – ISO 6438 for bibliographic purposes – was adopted but apparently little used (curiously, although this was adopted at about the same time as the African reference alphabet, there were some differences between the two, indicating perhaps a lack of communication between efforts to harmonize transcription of African languages and the ISO standards process).

Unicode in principle resolves the issue of incompatible encoding, but other questions such as the handling of diacritics in extended Latin scripts are still being raised. These in turn relate to fundamental decisions regarding orthographies of African languages.

In recent years, Osmanya, Tifinagh, Bamum, Adlam, Bassa Vah, Medefaidrin, and N'Ko have been added to Unicode, as have individual characters to other ranges of languages used, such as Latin and Arabic. Efforts to encode African scripts, including minority scripts and major historical writing systems like Egyptian hieroglyphs, are being coordinated by the Script Encoding Initiative.

Notes

References
 CISSE, Mamadou. 2006. Ecrits et écritures en Afrique de l'Ouest. Sudlangues n°6. http://www.sudlangues.sn/spip.php?article101
 Dalby, David. 1967. A survey of the indigenous scripts of Liberia and Sierra Leone: Vai, Mende, Kpelle, and Bassa. African Language Studies 8:1-51.
 Dalby, David. 1968. The indigenous scripts of West Africa and Surinam: their inspiration and design. African Language Studies 9:156-197.
 Dalby, David. 1969. Further indigenous scripts of West Africa: Manding, Wolof, and Fula alphabets and Yoruba holy-writing. African Language Studies 10:161-191
 Mafundikwa, Saki. 2004. Afrikan alphabets: the story of writing in Afrika. West New York, NJ: Mark Batty. 
 Hayward, Richard J. and Mohammed Hassan. 1981. The Oromo Orthography of Shaykh Bakri Sapalo. Bulletin of the School of Oriental and African Studies 44.3:550-556.
 Pasch, Helma. 2008. Competing scripts: the introduction of the Roman alphabet in Africa. International Journal for the Sociology of Language 191:65-109.
 Savage, Andrew. 2008. Writing Tuareg — the three script options. International Journal of the Sociology of Language 192: 5-14.
 Tuchscherer, Konrad. 1999. The lost script of the Bagam. African Affairs 98:55-77.
 Unseth, Peter. 2011. Invention of scripts in West Africa for ethnic revitalization. In The Success-Failure Continuum in Language and Ethnic Identity Efforts, (Handbook of Language and Ethnic Identity, Volume 2.), ed. by Joshua A. Fishman and Ofelia García, pp. 23–32. New York: Oxford University Press.
 Unseth, Peter. 2016. The international impact of Sequoyah’s Cherokee syllabary. Written Language & Literacy 19(1), pp. 75–93. [The impact of Cherokee to Vai and then Vai on others in W. Africa]
 Wyrod, Christopher. 2008. A social orthography of identity: the N’ko literacy movement in West Africa. International Journal of the Sociology of Language 192:27-44.

External links
 Scripts of Africa
  Systèmes alphabétiques des langues africaines
  Phenomenon of the African idea of the written language